The 1980 IAAF World Cross Country Championships was held in Paris, France, at the Hippodrome de Longchamp on March 9, 1980.   A report on the event was given in the Evening Times.

Complete results for men, junior men,  women, medallists, 
 and the results of British athletes were published.

Medallists

Race results

Senior men's race (12.58 km)

Note: Athletes in parentheses did not score for the team result

Junior men's race (7.41 km)

Note: Athletes in parentheses did not score for the team result

Senior women's race (4.82 km)

Note: Athletes in parentheses did not score for the team result

Medal table (unofficial)

Note: Totals include both individual and team medals, with medals in the team competition counting as one medal.

Participation
An unofficial count yields the participation of 381 athletes from 28 countries.  This is in agreement with the official numbers as published.

 (17)
 (21)
 (18)
 (3)
 (2)
 (16)
 (21)
 (9)
 (21)
 (4)
 (21)
 (4)
 (20)
 (7)
 (14)
 (19)
 (7)
 (5)
 (8)
 (21)
 (17)
 (21)
 (8)
 (3)
 (14)
 (21)
 (20)
 (19)

See also
 1980 IAAF World Cross Country Championships – Senior men's race
 1980 IAAF World Cross Country Championships – Junior men's race
 1980 IAAF World Cross Country Championships – Senior women's race
 1980 in athletics (track and field)

References

External links
The World Cross Country Championships 1973-2005
GBRathletics

 
World Athletics Cross Country Championships
C
IAAF World Cross Country Championships
International athletics competitions hosted by France
Athletics in Paris
Cross country running in France
IAAF World Cross Country Championships
IAAF World Cross Country Championships
International sports competitions hosted by Paris